Table tennis is unique among racket sports in that it supports a large variety of different styles of players. As players' levels increase, the diversity of styles decreases slightly, because technically weak styles are quickly eliminated; but, even at the very top of international table tennis, there are many dramatically different styles to be found. , attacking styles dominate most of the top places in the world. However, this may be due to the relative popularity of attack over defense, as defensive players are still able to reach the highest levels of international competition.

This article describes some of the most common table tennis styles seen in international competition. These are stereotypes, and almost all players possess some combination of these styles, with a few added "special" shots of their own.

Racket grips
Competitive table tennis players grip their rackets in a variety of ways. The manner in which competitive players grip their rackets can be classified into two major families of styles; one is described as penhold and the other shakehand. Numerous variations on gripping styles exist. The International Table Tennis Federation's (ITTF) Laws of Table Tennis do not prescribe the manner in which one must grip the racket.

Penhold grip
The Penhold grip is named as such because of the similarity to the way that pens are held. Penhold grip styles have suffered in recent years due to their inherent weakness on the backhand side. This weakness makes it much harder for penhold beginners to perform well against their shakehand counterparts. However, this has not stopped top penhold players from winning the World Championships, the World Cup and the Olympic Games regularly, as the backhand weakness can be covered adequately with excellent footwork, or supplemented with the recent reverse penhold backhand loop innovation.

Shakehand grip
Possibly the oldest surviving grip since the table tennis racket took its current shape. This is similar to a tennis grip with the index finger extended over the racket head perpendicular to the handle. This grip allows nearly even power distribution over forehand and backhand shots, but has a wider crossover point in between. This crossover point between the forehand and backhand is an area of weakness. 

Virtually all European players and roughly two thirds of Asian players use this grip.

Unusual grips
Although the vast majority of table tennis players grip the racket in one of the two styles above, there are some curious grips that have not proven their effectiveness at a high level of play yet, and are very rare.
 V-grip An experimental style being developed in China, it is held by forming a "V for victory" sign and gripping the blade between the forefinger and middle finger while having the other fingers rest under and on top of the handle; it requires a modified blade to grip successfully. This grip produces a noticeable spin benefit due to the longer lever and mechanics utilized in the forehand and backhand (much like those found in the Western grip in tennis).
 Seemiller gripA grip that was developed and popularized by Dan Seemiller, an American table tennis champion. In the Seemiller grip, the tip of the forefinger is placed so it reaches near the edge of the bat (or, in the case of another American champion, Eric Boggan, actually wraps around the edge of the bat). This enables Seemiller grip players to get tremendous wrist snap, adding spin to their forehand strokes. However, it also makes it awkward to hit shots using a traditional backhand, using the opposite side of the racket. So, instead, Seemiller grip players hit their backhands with the same side of the racket as they hit their forehands, turning their wrists over the way a baseball player would to make a backhand catch, and typically blocking or counter-hitting the ball. Since they would otherwise use only one side of their racket to hit all their shots, Seemiller grip players often put a rubber with very different playing characteristics on the other side of their bat, commonly a low-friction "anti-spin" rubber that they use to return spinny serves or to abruptly change the pace of the ball during a rally. Seemiller, in fact, is credited with virtually inventing the combo bat, a racket with different types of rubber on each side. This grip also has the nickname "windshield wiper" due to the motion of the backhand and forehand.

Penhold styles

Looper
Penhold loopers utilize the forehand topspin loop as their primary shot. This type of player usually exhibits excellent footwork, trying to use the forehand to cover most of or the entire table. Compared with shakehand loopers, penhold loopers have a shorter reach and try to stay close to the table even during powerful loop exchanges.

Notable penhold loopers include 1981-83 World Champion Guo Yuehua, 1988 Olympic Gold Medalist Yoo Nam-kyu, 1992 Olympics Men's Doubles Gold Medalist Lü Lin, 1992 Olympics Bronze medalist Kim Taek-soo, 2001-03 World Men's Doubles Champion Yan Sen, 2004 Olympic Gold Medalist Ryu Seung-min, 2008 Olympic Gold Medalist Ma Lin, 2009 World Champion Wang Hao, and 2015 Men's and Mixed Doubles Champion Xu Xin.

Counter driver
The penhold advantage of a small crossover is fully utilized in this style. Staying close to the table, counter drivers block and drive the opponent's topspins back across the table at speed, trying to force them out of position or look for the opportunistic forehand kill. Counter drivers usually have a safe forehand loop as well, in case the opponent is a chopper and doesn't give topspins or easy kills readily.

Notable penhold counter drivers include 2000 Asian Champion Chiang Peng-lung and South Korean player Moon Hyun-jung

Short pips hitter
This traditional penhold style utilizes a short pips out rubber on one or both sides of the racket. Short pips hitters play over the table, hitting the ball as soon as it bounces off the table with the pips negating the majority of the opponent's spin. This aggressive attacking can win points easily during the first few returns, but the lack of a topspin Magnus effect means that the attacks are less effective when the opponent is forced back.

Notable penhold short pips hitters include 1996 Olympic Champion Liu Guoliang, 1985 and 1987 World Champion Jiang Jialiang, three-time Olympian Toshio Tasaki, Yang Ying, Kwak Bang-bang, Seok Eun-mi, He Zhi Wen, Lee Eun-hee, Wang Zeng Yi and Rory Cargill.

Shakehand styles

Looper
Shakehand loopers apply pressure and win points primarily with fast and spinny loops from the forehand. After the opening exchanges, when the first attack has been made, loopers will attack with a variety of topspin shots varying in speed and spin, maneuvering their opponents around the table and looking for outright winners. The power and reach of a shakehand looper means that they can counterloop even when forced back from the table, which can be quite a spectacle when a lobbing looper forced back by smashes suddenly attacks in an attempt to regain initiative.

Notable loopers include Vladimir Samsonov, Jean-Michel Saive, Werner Schlager, Wang Liqin, Ma Long, Fan Zhendong, Zhang Jike, Ding Ning.

All-round attacker
Like a looper, the all-round attacker uses the loop as a primary weapon. In addition, an equally effective backhand increases the chances of having the first attack, and the number of angles that could be attacked. While this potentially means that the player could get confused whether to attack using the forehand or backhand, most players tend to use the more powerful forehand, making all-round attackers not that different from loopers.

Counter driver
The shakehand counter driver blocks and drives various attacks back at the opponent, forcing errors through changing angles and rhythm. A series of quick drives and blocks between counter drivers can look quite impressive, with balls seeming to fly everywhere. This style is popular among female players, since the relatively weaker attacks are easier to block compared to the men's game. Notable players include multiple-time Olympic champion Zhang Yining, Fukuhara Ai, Tie Yana and He Zhuojia.

Attacking chopper
The single most distinctive style in table tennis is the attacking chopper. While other styles look to attack and gain initiative, the chopper gives up the initiative, using the chop to return an attack with backspin, and making it necessary for the opponent to start the attack all over again. The defensive chopper returns repeated attacks with slow, floating backspin chops executed as late as possible, taking as much time as necessary to tire out and frustrate the opponent. Chops can vary in the amount of backspin (from no spin to floating), sidespin (curving into the table or away from the opponent), or position, making it hard to continuously attack. If the opponent refuses to tire out or starts to play defensively, the attacking chopper can suddenly mix in a loop or smash attack, in order to catch the opponent off guard. Inverted rubber is usually employed in the forehand, but the backhand is usually reserved for long or short pips rubber, which is much easier to control. Some players reverse their racket in order to use the pips rubber on the forehand.

Notable choppers  include Koji Matsushita, Svetlana Ganina, Irina Kotikhina and Viktoria Pavlovich, but some refuse to do that to keep their style simple, including Chen Weixing (Chen does use the inverted rubber on his backhand to attack, occasionally), Joo Sae-Hyuk, Ding Song, Kim Kyung-ah, Park Mi-young and Tan Paey Fern. Very few players choose to defend with inverted rubber on both sides, a notable example of which is Wang Tingting.

Points between a chopper and an attacker are usually the easiest for non-players to appreciate, because of the slowness of the ball and the spectacular chopping style.

References 

styles
Sports techniques